Waves was an airline based in Guernsey in the Channel Islands and a subsidiary of Waves Technologies Limited,  a privately owned company. It planned to operate from its hub at Guernsey Airport to up to 15 regional airports in and around the Channel Islands. Waves also planned to undertake cargo and medevac activities, on demand.

History
Waves was founded by Nick Magliocchetti in 2016 to establish an on-demand service in-line with similar private-hire taxi services as well as timetabled services.

On 22 September 2017, Waves received its air operator certificate (AOC) from 2-REG, the civil aviation authority of Guernsey. Commercial service between Guernsey and Jersey began on 5 November 2017 and by 9 November, the airline had operated 100 flights. Waves made its first flight into Alderney on 14 November, and promised commercial service from the island, beginning later in 2017. Flights to the UK are planned to start in 2018, as well as services to regional French airports.

Due a lawsuit by competitor Blue Islands against the States of Guernsey's Transport Licensing Authority (TLA), Waves was forced in January 2018 to temporarily change its business model, to have customers hire the entire aircraft, instead of booking individual seats. In March 2018, the TLA issued Waves with route licences for Jersey and Alderney, allowing it to sell individual seats once again.

In June 2018 the company announced it was suspending all flights due to a maintenance issue. It was subsequently placed into liquidation in September 2018.

Destinations
Waves served the following destinations: 
France
 Brest - Charter
 Cherbourg – Maupertus Airport - Charter
 Caen – Carpiquet Airport - Charter
 Dinard - Charter
 Granville-Michel - Charter
 Lannion - Charter
 Nantes - Charter
 Rennes - Charter
 Saint-Brieuc - Charter
Channel Islands
 Guernsey Airport - Base
 Jersey Airport
 Alderney Airport

Fleet
Waves operated one Cessna 208B Grand Caravan on a dry lease which has since been put up for sale by its owners.

References

External links
Official website

Defunct airlines of Guernsey
Airlines established in 2016
Airlines disestablished in 2018
Defunct charter airlines of the United Kingdom